Balcarres; 2006 population 598) is a town located in southern Saskatchewan, Canada along Highway 10 and Highway 22, approximately 85 km northeast of Regina.  Highway 619 and Highway 310 are nearby highways to this community.

Neighbouring communities include Fort Qu'Appelle to the west, to the southeast Abernethy, and to the north Ituna. The File Hills First Nations of Little Black Bear, Peepeekisis, Okanese, and Star Blanket are also located to the northeast.

History

Balcarres post office was established in the North-West Territories on 1 April 1884.  The name originates from the first postmaster, Balcarres Crawford, at the neighbouring community of Indian Head, North-West Territories (now, since 1905, Saskatchewan).

Sites of interest 

Motherwell Homestead National Historic Site of Canada is within 10.5 miles, or 17 kilometres, of Balcarres.

Valley Centre Recreation Site, Lebret Recreation Site, and Katepwa Point Provincial Park are all within 20 kilometres as well.

Demographics 

Amenities
The town is home to several businesses including L&J Country Foods, two Chinese restaurants, Balcarres Country Inn, Henry's Family Fair, Baber's Pharmacy, a Royal Bank, as well as many others. Terminal 22, a large inland grain terminal, is located west of town along the Canadian National Railway rail line.

Balcarres has a hospital and senior citizens home called the Balcarres Integrated Care Centre or BICC, and an elementary and high school, which educates children from the communities of Balcarres, Abernethy, and the File Hills Indian reserves. There is a United, an Anglican and a Baptist church.

Notable people 

Walter Deiter, chief of the National Indian Brotherhood
James Garfield Gardiner, premier of Saskatchewan and minister in the Canadian Cabinet
Mandy Meyer, guitar player for Asia and Krokus
Kenneth Moore, ice hockey player in the 1932 Winter Olympics.
Noel Starblanket, chief of the National Indian Brotherhood
Doug Trapp, ice hockey left wing for the Buffalo Sabres
Jerry Walker, ice hockey winger

See also
 List of towns in Saskatchewan

References

External links

Towns in Saskatchewan
Abernethy No. 186, Saskatchewan
Division No. 6, Saskatchewan